Alfonso Artabe Meca (born 18 August 1988) is a Spanish professional footballer who plays as a central defender.

Club career
Born in Palma de Mallorca, Balearic Islands, Artabe only played in the lower leagues in his country. In the Segunda División B, he represented  Real Oviedo, CE Manacor, UE Llagostera, AE Prat, CD Atlético Baleares and CD Covadonga.

Artabe had professional spells in the Belgian First Division A (Sint-Truidense VV), the Cypriot First Division (Ermis Aradippou FC and Doxa Katokopias FC), the Romanian Liga I (FC Voluntari) and the Slovak Super Liga (MFK Zemplín Michalovce).

Personal life
Artabe's grandfather, Javier (1934–2020), was an important player for Oviedo in the 50s/60's, appearing with the club in La Liga as a forward.

Career statistics

Club

References

External links
 
 
 
 

1988 births
Living people
Spanish footballers
Footballers from Palma de Mallorca
Association football defenders
Segunda División B players
Tercera División players
Divisiones Regionales de Fútbol players
Real Oviedo Vetusta players
Real Oviedo players
UE Costa Brava players
AE Prat players
CD Atlético Baleares footballers
CD Covadonga players
Belgian Pro League players
Sint-Truidense V.V. players
Cypriot First Division players
Ermis Aradippou FC players
Doxa Katokopias FC players
TSW Pegasus FC players
Liga I players
FC Voluntari players
Slovak Super Liga players
MFK Zemplín Michalovce players
Spanish expatriate footballers
Expatriate footballers in Belgium
Expatriate footballers in Cyprus
Expatriate footballers in Hong Kong
Expatriate footballers in Romania
Expatriate footballers in Slovakia
Spanish expatriate sportspeople in Belgium
Spanish expatriate sportspeople in Cyprus
Spanish expatriate sportspeople in Hong Kong
Spanish expatriate sportspeople in Romania
Spanish expatriate sportspeople in Slovakia